Stolotermitidae is a family of termites in the order Blattodea, with two extant genera formerly placed in the family Termopsidae. There are about 14 described species in Stolotermitidae.

Genera
GBIF and the Termite Catalogue list the following:
 Porotermes Hagen, 1858
 Stolotermes Hagen, 1858
 † Chilgatermes Engel, Pan & Jacobs, 2013

References

Further reading

External links

Termites
Blattodea families